Hi tran is the operator of public transportation in the High Point, North Carolina area. It complements three other local and one regional bus service in the Piedmont Triad. Twelve routes travel almost solely within the city limits.

Facilities

Transit Operations Center
Address: 716 West Kivett Drive
Coordinates: 
Facilities: Administration, bus storage and maintenance

Broad Avenue Terminal
Address: 201 West Broad Avenue
Coordinates: 
Facilities: Main transfer point for the transit system, adjacent to the Amtrak station

Routes
10 North Main
11 South Main
12 West Green
13 Montlieu Ave
14 Westchester
15 Oak Hollow Mall
16 Leonard Ave
17 Washington Dr
18 East Green
19 English Rd
20 Kearns Ave
21 Industrial Park Flyer
25 GTCC/Jamestown
 PART Route 3: High Point Express, connects between the Broad Avenue Terminal and the regional hub in Greensboro.

References

Bus transportation in North Carolina
High Point, North Carolina